The Uganda Medical Association (UMA), is a registered non-governmental, professional organization that brings together all the qualified and duly registered medical doctors in Uganda.

Location
The association maintains its headquarters on the Second Floor, Kati House, at 2 Kyaggwe Road, in the central business district of Kampala, the capital and largest city of Uganda. The geographical coordinates of the headquarters of UMA are:0°19'09.0"N, 32°34'33.5"E (Latitude:0.319167; Longitude:32.575972).

Overview
According to the Association's website, UMA has five focus areas: (1) to "contribute to universal access to health and health care" (2) to "promote professional ethical standards among medical doctors in Uganda" (3) to "promote the welfare of medical doctors in Uganda" (4) to mobilize doctors to join and encourage them to actively participate in the Association’s activities and (5) to strengthen the financial base of the Association.

History
The Uganda Medical Association was founded in 1964 and functioned, in the beginning, as a branch of the British Medical Association.

Governance
The policies of the Association are set by the National Governing Council (NGC), a 55-member group, representing all medical and surgical sub-specialties and doctor groups, including medical and surgical interns, senior house officers and retired doctors.

Management
The Association is managed by a nine-member Executive Committee (EC), elected for two-year terms. The 2021-2023 EC is led by the President of the Association, Samuel Oledo, deputized by Dr. Edith Nakku .

See also
Uganda Dental Association
Uganda Medical and Dental Practitioners Council
World Medical Association

References

External links
Website of Uganda Medical Association
Parliament does not fix who becomes a doctor in Uganda As of 28 November 2017.

Medical and health organisations based in Uganda
Organizations established in 1964
1964 establishments in Uganda
Organisations based in Kampala